Glaciihabitans tibetensis is a Gram-positive, aerobic, non-spore-forming and short-rod-shaped bacterium from the genus Glaciihabitans which has been isolated from ice water from the Midui Glacier in Tibet.

References

Microbacteriaceae
Bacteria described in 2014